Alectryon repandodentatus is a species of plant in the family Sapindaceae. It is found in Australia and Papua New Guinea.

References

External links

repandodentatus
Sapindales of Australia
Flora of Papua New Guinea
Vulnerable flora of Australia
Nature Conservation Act endangered biota
Vulnerable biota of Queensland
Endangered flora of Australia
Flora of Queensland
Taxonomy articles created by Polbot